Trooper is a Romanian heavy metal music band.
It was formed on 25 October 1995, by brothers Alin and Aurelian Dincă and Ionuţ  Rădulescu being influenced by bands like Iron Maiden or Judas Priest.
The band used to be called Megarock, then White Wolf. Once with the arrival of Ionuţ "Negative" Fleancu the band was renamed to Trooper.
Poll conducted by the specialized Heavy Metal Magazine in 2001 placed Trooper first in the category Best young band.
The group appeared on MTV, MCM, Atomic, TVR1, TVR2, B1 TV, Antena 1, Romania International, Prima TV, Pro TV.
Throughout their career, Trooper have shared their stage with bands such as Iron Maiden, Manowar, Sepultura, Kreator and Evergrey.

Discography 
 2001 - Trooper (demo)
 2002 - Trooper I (full-length)
 2004 - EP (EP)
 2005 - Desant (full-length)
 2006 - Gloria (tribute to Iris)
 2006 - Electric (full-length)
 2007 - 12 Ani - Amintiri (boxset)
 2008 - Rock'N'Roll Pozitiv (full-length)
 2009 - Vlad Ţepeş - Poemele Valahiei (full-length)
 2010 - 15 (live album)
 2011 - Voodoo (full-length)
 2013 - Atmosfera (full-length)
 2016 - În ziua  (full-length)
 2018 - Stefan cel Mare - Poemele Moldovei (full length)
 2019 - Strigat Best Of 2002 - 2019 (boxset)

Members 
 Alin "Coiotu" Dincă - vocals (1995–present)
 Aurelian "Balaur" Dincă - Lead/rhythm guitar (1995–present)
 Cristian Oftez - Lead/rhtyhm guitar (2014 - present)
 Ionuţ "Oscar" Rădulescu - Bass guitar (1995–present)
 Ionuţ "John" Covalciuc - Drums  (1999–present)

Past members 
 Radu "Schija" Pites - Lead/rhythm guitar
 Ionuţ "Negative" Fleancu - Drums
 Laurentiu Popa - Lead/rhythm guitar

References

External links 
Interviu cu Alin Dincă (Coiot') Trooper rockul.info 
Formaţia Trooper sărbătoreşte 12 ani de heavy-metal printr-un turneu naţional (musicmix.rol.ro) 
 Formaţia Trooper salvează Delta Dunării prin muzică (HotNews.ro) 
Rock’s not dead (Time Out Bucuresti) 
 Lauren Harris şi Trooper, în deschidere la Iron Maiden (Ziare.com) 
mediafax.ro 
muzica.ro 
primatv.ro 

Romanian heavy metal musical groups
Romanian rock music groups